Liam James Botham (born 26 August 1977) is a former English sportsman who played both codes of rugby football and cricket. He is the son of England cricketer Ian Botham, the Baron Botham.

Career

Cricket
Botham was born in Doncaster and initially followed in his father's footsteps, playing county cricket for Hampshire. He played three matches in the 1996 season. He took the wicket of former England captain Mike Gatting on his County Championship debut.

After retiring from rugby, there were signs that Botham might return to playing competitive cricket; in 2006, he played in an England XI victory against Lancashire in a testimonial match for Andrew Flintoff at Old Trafford.

Rugby union
Botham left cricket in 1997 after one senior season and signed for rugby union club West Hartlepool, where he played as a wing or fullback. He later moved to Cardiff and Newcastle Falcons.

While at Newcastle the club won the 2001 Tetley Bitter Cup, in the final of which he was a replacement, and reached the final of the European Shield.

Botham made his début for the England under-21 team in 1997 against France, and then played in the SANZAR tournament in South Africa in 1998. He was called up to the senior England squad by Clive Woodward for their 2000 tour of South Africa. He played in tour matches against the Leopards and Griqualand West but never won a senior international cap.

Rugby league
After becoming disillusioned with rugby union, he switched sports again in 2003 to rugby league. He initially joined the Bradford Bulls and had a short spell playing for their academy team. He then signed a dual-code contract with Super League club Leeds Rhinos, who felt that signing the inexperienced Botham was less of a risk as he also played for their partner rugby union club Leeds Tykes.

In 2004, Botham also played for London Broncos on loan, and in 2005 signed for Wigan Warriors, feeling he could not get a regular place in the Rhinos team.

In 2005, Botham announced his retirement aged 27 after a neck injury.

Post-playing career
Since retiring, Botham has run a sports travel company, established in 2016.

Personal life
Botham married Sarah-Jayne, with whom he has three children. Their son James plays rugby union for Cardiff Blues and made his full international debut for Wales in 2020.

The couple later divorced and Botham married Lisa Harrison in 2013. She gave birth to their son Benji in July 2015.

References

External links
 
 

1977 births
Living people
Bradford Bulls players
Cricketers from Doncaster
Cumberland cricketers
English cricketers of 1969 to 2000
English cricketers
English rugby league players
English rugby union players
Hampshire cricketers
Leeds Rhinos players
Leeds Tykes players
London Broncos players
Newcastle Falcons players
People educated at Rossall School
Rugby league players from Doncaster
Rugby union players from Doncaster
Sons of life peers
Wigan Warriors players